Morjac are a Danish electronic duo, composed of producers Morten Lambertsen and Jacob Johansen. They met in 1990, as members of the band King Kane. Morjac are best known for their 2003 single "Stars", which featured Raz Conway on vocals and reached Number 38 on the UK Singles Chart. It was also playlisted on BBC Radio 1's C list.

Discography

Singles

References

External links
 

Danish electronic music groups
Danish house music groups
Electronic music duos
Remixers
Ultra Records artists